Nanchang is the capital of Jiangxi Province, People's Republic of China. Located in the north-central part of the province and in the hinterland of Poyang Lake Plain, it is bounded on the west by the Jiuling Mountains, and on the east by Poyang Lake. Because of its strategic location connecting the prosperous East and South China, it has become a major railway hub in Southern China in recent decades.

As the Nanchang Uprising in 1927 is distinctively recognized by the ruling Communist Party as "firing the first gunshot against the evil Nationalists", the current government has therefore named the city since 1949 "the City of Heroes", "the place where the People's Liberation Army was born", and the most widely known "place where the military banner of the People's Liberation Army was first raised". Nanchang is also a major city, appearing among the top 150 cities in the world by scientific research outputs, as tracked by the Nature Index and home to Nanchang University, the key national university of “Project 211” in the city.

History

The territories encompassing modern-day Jiangxi Province—including Nanchang—was first incorporated into China during the Qin dynasty, when it was conquered from the Baiyue peoples and organized as Jiujiang Commandery.  In 201 BC, during the Han dynasty, the city was given the Chinese name Nanchang and became the administrative seat of Yuzhang Commandery, and was governed by Guan Ying, one of Emperor Gaozu of Han's generals. The name Nanchang means "southern flourishing", derived from a motto of developing what is now southern China that is traditionally attributed to Emperor Gaozu himself.

In AD 589, during the Sui dynasty, this commandery was changed into a prefecture named Hongzhou, and after 763 it became the provincial center of Jiangxi, which was then beginning the rapid growth that by the 12th century made it the most populous province in China.

In 653 the Tengwang Pavilion was constructed, and in 675 Wang Bo wrote the classic "Tengwang Ge Xu", a poetic introductory masterpiece celebrating the building, making the building, the city, and the author himself known to literate Chinese-speaking population ever since. The Pavilion has been destroyed and rebuilt several times throughout history. Its present form was reconstructed in the 1980s after being destroyed in 1929 during the Chinese Civil War.

In 959, under the Southern Tang regime, Nanchang was made superior prefecture and the southern capital. After the conquest by the Song regime in 981 it was reverted to the name Hongzhou. In 1164 it was renamed Longxing prefecture, which name it retained until 1368. During the Yuan dynasty it was the capital of Jiangxi Province, an area that included Guangdong as well. At the end of the Yuan (Mongol) period (1279–1368), it became a battleground between Zhu Yuanzhang, the founder of the Ming dynasty (1368–1644), and the rival local warlord, Chen Youliang. At the beginning of the 16th century it was the power base from which Zhu Chenhao, the Prince of Ning, launched a rebellion against the emperor.

During the Yuan Dynasty, it might have been the centre of porcelain trade

During the reign of the Wanli Emperor of the Ming dynasty, it housed relatives of the emperor who had been exiled because they were potential claimants of the imperial throne, members of the imperial family constituting about one quarter of the city's population; as a result of this, Matteo Ricci came here when trying to gain entry to Beijing.

In the 1850s it suffered considerably as a result of the Taiping Rebellion (1850–64), and its importance as a commercial centre declined as the overland routes to Canton were replaced by coastal steamship services in the latter half of the 19th century. Nanchang has, however, remained the undisputed regional metropolis of Jiangxi.

On August 1, 1927, Nanchang was the site of one of a series of insurrections organized by the communists. The Nanchang Uprising, led by pro-communist Kuomintang officers under Soviet direction, succeeded in holding the city for only a few days, and provided a core of troops and a method of organization from which the People's Liberation Army (PLA) later developed.

In 1939, the Battle of Nanchang, a ferocious battle between the Chinese National Revolutionary Army and the Imperial Japan Army in the Second Sino-Japanese War took place.

By 1949 Nanchang was still essentially an old-style administrative and commercial city, with little industry apart from food processing; it had a population of about 275,000. Nanchang first acquired a rail connection in 1915, only connecting to the port city of Jiujiang by the Yangtze. Several other rail links have since been opened. After World War II a line was completed to Linchuan and Gongqi in the Ru River Valley to the south-southeast.

Since 1949 Nanchang has been extensively industrialized. It is now a large-scale producer of cotton textiles and cotton yarn. Paper making is also a major industry, as is food processing (especially rice milling). Heavy industry began to gain prominence in the mid-1950s. A large thermal-power plant was installed and uses coal brought by rail from Fengcheng to the south. A machinery industry also grew up, at first mainly concentrating on the production of agricultural equipment and diesel engines. Nanchang then became a minor centre of the automotive industry in China, producing trucks and tractors and also accessories such as tires. An iron-smelting plant helping to supply local industry was installed in the later 1950s. There is also a large chemical industry, producing agricultural chemicals and insecticides as well as pharmaceuticals.

Geography

Climate 

Nanchang has a monsoon-influenced humid subtropical climate (Köppen Cfa) with four
distinct seasons. Winters are short and cool with occasional frosts; it begins somewhat sunny and dry but becomes progressively wetter and more overcast. Summer is long and humid, with amongst the highest temperatures of any Chinese provincial capital, and with the sun shining close to 60 percent of the time in July and August, is the sunniest time of year. Autumn is warm to mild with the lowest rainfall levels of the year.

Demographics

As of the 2020 Chinese census, Nanchang had a population of 6,255,007, of which 5,382,162 lived in built-up (urbanized) area consisting of 6 urban districts plus Nanchang County largely being urbanized. 37 ethnic groups were counted amongst its prefecture divisions.

Administration 

 Honggutan New District is an economic management area and not a formal administrative division.

Economy

Nanchang is a regional hub for agricultural production in Jiangxi province. The yield of grain was 16.146 million tons in 2000. Products such as rice and oranges are economic staples. The Ford Motor Company has a plant in Nanchang, assembling the Ford Transit van as part of the Jiangling Motor joint venture. Much of its industry revolves around aircraft manufacturing, automobile manufacturing, metallurgy, electro-mechanics, textile, chemical engineering, traditional Chinese medicine, pharmaceuticals and others. Nanchang has a rapid economic development and ranks 15th among the fastest growing 20 cities in the world. It is one of the cities with the most potential for development in China and the world in the future.

In 2017, the city's gross regional product (GDP) was 500.319 billion yuan(US$80.03 billion ), an increase of 9.0% over the previous year. The primary industry's added value was 19.213 billion yuan, an increase of 4.0%; the secondary industry's added value was 266.61 billion yuan, an increase of 8.4%; The added value of the three industries was 214.496 billion yuan, an increase of 10.2%. The per capita GDP of 81,598 yuan was converted to 12,285 US dollars according to the average annual exchange rate, and the total fiscal revenue for the year was 78.282 billion yuan, an increase of 14.3% over the previous year.

The GDP of Nanchang in 2008 was 166 billion Yuan (US$24.3 billion ). The GDP per capita was 36,105 Yuan (US$5,285). The total value of imports and exports was 3.4 billion US dollars.
The total financial revenue was 23 billion Yuan.

Industrial zones
National level development zones
Nanchang Export Processing Zone
Nanchang National Export Expressing Zone is located in Nanchang Hi-Tech Industrial Development Zone, it was approved by the State Council on May 8, 2006, and passed the national acceptance inspection on Sep 7th, 2007. It has a planning area of 1 km2 and now has built 0.31 km2. It enjoys simple and convenient customs clearances, and special preferential policies both for Nanchang National Export Expressing Zone and NCHDZ.
Nanchang National High-tech Industrial Development Zone
Nanchang National High-tech Industrial Development Zone (NCHDZ for short hereafter) is the only national grade high-tech zoned in Jiangxi, it was established in Mar. 1991. NCHDZ possesses unique nature condition and sound industry foundation of accepting electronics industry. NCHDZ has brought 25 percent industrial added value and 50 percent industrial benefit and tax to Nanchang city by using only 0.4 percent land area.
Nanchang Economic and Technological Development Zone

Provincial level development zones
Jiangxi Shanghai Economic and Technological Development Zone
Nanchang Yingxiong Economic and Technological Development Zone

Special economic district
Honggutan New District   GanJiang New District

Transportation

Nanchang has an advantageous geographic location and convenient transportation. It is praised as the “three rivers and five lakes, and the control of the finer and better lakes”. It relies on high-speed railways and aviation hubs to connect three important economic circles (Yangtze River Delta, Pearl River Delta, Inter-provincial traffic corridors in Haixi District). Nanchang is one of the country's comprehensive transportation hubs and one of the most important integrated transportation hubs in Jiangxi.

Rail
The Nanchang is an important rail hub for southeastern China. The Beijing–Kowloon (Jingjiu) Railway, Shanghai–Kunming railway (formerly Zhejiang–Jiangxi or Zhegan Railway), Xiangtang–Putian railway and Nanchang–Jiujiang intercity railway converge in Nanchang.  Nanchang's Bureau of Railways operates much of the railway network in Jiangxi and neighbouring Fujian province.
The Nanchang railway station and the Nanchang West railway station are the primary passenger rail stations of the city.  Nanchang is connected to Hangzhou, Changsha and Shanghai via CRH (China Railway High-speed) service.

Air

Nanchang Changbei International Airport (KHN) built in 1996 is the main international airport. It is situated in Lehua Town, 26 kilometres north of the CDB area. Changbei International Airport is the only one in Jiangxi Province which has an international air route. The airport is connected to major mainland cities such as Shenzhen,  Guangzhou, Haikou, Shanghai and Beijing. There is a military/civilian airport near Liantang, Nanchang County.

Nanchang Changbei International Airport is the largest airport in Jiangxi Province. In 2014, Nanchang Changbei Airport opened up to 10 international destinations. The airport handled 7.25 million passengers in 2014, an increase of 6.3%. Among them, the Nanchang aviation port exceeded 280,000 passengers, an increase of nearly 40%, becoming the airport's traffic volume. The important force of growth, and will continue to maintain rapid development. On December 6, 2017, the annual passenger throughput of Nanchang Airport exceeded 10 million passengers, making it the nation's 31st “million-grade airport”. In 2017, passenger throughput reached 10.93 million, a year-on-year increase of 39.0%, a net increase of passenger throughput of 3.07 million passengers; flights took off and 89,000 vehicles, a year-on-year increase of 35.2%; and cargo and mail throughput of 52,000 tons, an increase of 3.3%. In order to cooperate with the construction of the Beijing-Kowloon high-speed railway and Nanchang North Station airport complex transportation hub, large-scale expansion and upgrades are being carried out recently.

Road
The road transport infrastructure in Nanchang is extensive. A number of national highways cross through the city. They are the National roads No.105 from Beijing to Zhuhai, No.320 from Shanghai to Kunming, and No.316 from Fuzhou to Lanzhou. The major transport companies that operate in Nanchang are the Chang'an Transport Company Limited, the Nanchang Long-distance Bus Station, and the Xufang Bus Station. National Highway G70 crosses through Nanchang. Nanchang also built its round-city highway G70_01 opening in 2007.

The Nanchang Long-distance Bus Station serves long-distance routes to Nanjing, Shenzhen, Hefei and other cities outside Jiangxi Province. The Xufang Bus Station operates routes to cities, towns and counties within Jiangxi Province.

Metro

Nanchang Rail Transit is the first rail transportation system in Jiangxi Province, the world's leading MRT system, the second batch of rail transit cities in China. It will connect Nanchang's main downtown area and each satellite city, the Nanchang Metro has been in service since 26th Dec 2015. Nanchang is the 25th city in mainland China to put into operation. The planning of Nanchang rail transit project started in 1999 and was officially started in 2009. The first phase of the No. 1 and No. 2 lines was 50,996 kilometers (the first line is the underground line). Line 1 was officially opened and operated at the end of 2015, and Line 2 of the “First Section” began trial operation on August 19, 2017.

Water
Nanchang is situated on the Gan River, the Fu River, Elephant Lake, Qingshan Lake, and Aixi Lake. Hence the water routes for Nanchang are critically important for the economy, trade and shipping. Nanchang Port is the biggest port on the Gan River. Passengers can take Nanchang Port and travel by boat to the Jinggang Shan and Tengwang Pavilion. There are passenger ships that also visit Poyang Lake, Stone Bell Hill, Poyang Lake Bird Protection Area, Dagu Hill and other attractions.

Landmarks

 Tengwang Pavilion, a towering pavilion dating to 653, on the east bank of the Gan River and is one of "the Four Great Towers of China"
 Poyang Lake, the largest fresh water lake in China, it is also called "the Migrator Birds Paradise".
 Star of Nanchang, which was the world's tallest Ferris wheel from 2006–2008, in Honggutan District
 Qiushui Square, established on 28 January 2004 with the largest music fountain group with music in Asia.
 Jiangxi Provincial Museum and Bada Shanren Exhibition Hall
 People's Park, the largest park in downtown Nanchang
Bayi Square and Memorial, at the center of Nanchang, commemorates the founding of the People's Liberation Army during the Nanchang Uprising of 1 August (Ba Yi in Mandarin) in 1927, which led to the formation of the People's Republic of China in 1949.

Education
Colleges and universities (note that institutions without full-time bachelor programs are not listed):
Jiangxi University of Finance and Economics
Nanchang University
Jiangxi Normal University
Nanchang Hangkong University
Jiangxi Agricultural University
East China Jiaotong University
East China University of Technology, Nanchang Campus
Jiangxi Institute of Traditional Chinese Medicine
Nanchang Institute of Technology
Jiangxi Science and Technology Normal University
Jiangxi Manufacturing and Vocational College
Jiangxi University of Traditional Chinese Medicine

High schools:
 Affiliated Middle School of Jiangxi Normal University
 Nanchang No.2 Middle School
 Nanchang No.1 Middle School
 Nanchang No.3 Middle School
 Nanchang No.10 Middle School

International schools:
Nanchang International School

Sport
Nanchang is the site of Jiangxi International Women's Tennis Open.

References

; 247 pages

External links

Nanchang Government website
Map of Nanchang

 
Cities in Jiangxi
Prefecture-level divisions of Jiangxi
Provincial capitals in China
1st-century BC establishments in China
Populated places established in the 1st century BC
201 BC
200s BC establishments